Sibut Airport  is an airstrip serving Sibut, a city in the Kémo prefecture of the Central African Republic. It was built after January 2014 and replaces a long closed airport east of Sibut.

See also

Transport in the Central African Republic
List of airports in the Central African Republic

References

External links 
OpenStreetMap - Sibut

OurAirports - Sibut Airport
FallingRain - Sibut Airport

Airports in the Central African Republic
Buildings and structures in Kémo